Armin Hahne (born September 10, 1955 in Moers, West Germany) is a German racing driver, best known for his exploits in touring car racing. The highpoint of his career was winning both the 1982 and 1983 Spa 24 Hours driving BMW's. Another highlight of his career was driving in the factory supported Tom Walkinshaw Racing run Jaguar Racing team racing the Jaguar XJS coupes. Hahne stayed with the team as they transitioned to Rover Vitesse. In 1991 he drove for one race in the British Touring Car Championship for BMW.

Later in his career, Armin Hahne raced mostly on the Nürburgring Nordschleife, finishing second overall in 2008 in the Adac 24 hours, driving a Porsche 911 GT3-MR entered by Manthey Racing.

In 2011, he won the second round of the VLN race series, co-driving a Mercedes-Benz SLS AMG GT3 entered by the Mamerow / Rowe Racing with Chris Mamerow.

He also is the youngest brother of Formula One driver Hubert Hahne as well as the uncle of fellow racing driver Jörg van Ommen.

Bathurst 1000

Hahne's first start in the Australian classic was in 1984 when he partnered Englishman Jeff Allam in a Mobil Rover Racing Rover Vitesse to an easy Group A class win and an excellent 12th outright after starting 36th against much more powerful opposition (the Rover qualified 10 seconds slower than the pole winning Nissan Bluebird Turbo of George Fury and finished just 11 laps down on the winning V8 powered Holden VK Commodore of Peter Brock and Larry Perkins). A brief return to Jaguar in 1985 saw Hahne team with Australian racer John Goss to win the 1985 James Hardie 1000 after starting sixth. On the Bathurst podium, Hahne would call this his greatest win.

His next time at Bathurst was in 1987 for the World Touring Car Championship round in an ill-fated Maserati Biturbo with Australian Kevin Bartlett. A troubled race week saw them start 34th and retire after only 29 laps with a broken differential. 1988 saw him in a Mark Petch Motorsport Ford Sierra RS500 with New Zealand racer Robbie Francevic, the car engineered by its previous owner and Hahne's team boss in the 1988 ETCC, former Wolf Racing Formula One team owner Walter Wolf. Their strong charge finished on lap 103 due to overheating after they had been in either second or third place for the previous 70 laps. That was Hahne's last race in the Bathurst 1000.

Career results
Results sourced from Driver Database and History of Touring Car Racing.

Racing record

Complete World Touring Car Championship results
(key) (Races in bold indicate pole position) (Races in italics indicate fastest lap)

Complete British Touring Car Championship results
(key) (Races in bold indicate pole position) (Races in italics indicate fastest lap)

Complete Japanese Touring Car Championship (1994-) results
(key) (Races in bold indicate pole position) (Races in italics indicate fastest lap)

Complete All-Japan GT Championship results
(key) (Races in bold indicate pole position) (Races in italics indicate fastest lap)

Complete Spa 24 Hour results

Complete 24 Hours of Le Mans results

Complete Bathurst 1000 results

References

German racing drivers
British Touring Car Championship drivers
Living people
1955 births
Bathurst 1000 winners
24 Hours of Le Mans drivers
24 Hours of Spa drivers
World Touring Car Championship drivers
People from Moers
Sportspeople from Düsseldorf (region)
Racing drivers from North Rhine-Westphalia
European Touring Car Championship drivers
Australian Endurance Championship drivers
Toyota Gazoo Racing drivers
Nürburgring 24 Hours drivers
BMW M drivers
Jaguar Racing drivers
Racing Bart Mampaey drivers
Rowe Racing drivers
Schnitzer Motorsport drivers